Two-Gun Caballero is a 1931 American Western film directed by Jack Nelson and starring Robert Frazer, Consuelo Dawn and Carmen Laroux.

Cast
 Robert Frazer as Bob Blake - posing as Lopez 
 Consuelo Dawn as Sally Thompson 
 Carmen Laroux as Rosita - Lopez's Sweetheart 
 Bobby Nelson as Jimmy Thompson 
 Jack Perrin as Sheriff 
 Pat Harmon as Butch Devlin 
 Diane Esmonds as Mrs. Steele 
 Al Ferguson as Burke

References

Bibliography
 Michael R. Pitts. Poverty Row Studios, 1929–1940: An Illustrated History of 55 Independent Film Companies, with a Filmography for Each. McFarland & Company, 2005.

External links
 

1931 films
1931 Western (genre) films
American Western (genre) films
Films directed by Jack Nelson
1930s English-language films
1930s American films